The 102nd United States Colored Infantry was an African American infantry regiment of United States Colored Troops in the Union Army during the American Civil War. The unit was organized as the 1st Michigan Colored Volunteer Infantry Regiment before being redesignated as the 102nd Regiment USCT.

History
The 1st Michigan Colored Infantry was formed on February 17, 1863, after an editorial and letter writing campaign by Henry Barns, an editor for the Detroit Tribune and Advertiser. Barns was commissioned the regiment's first colonel for his efforts; he maintained this post until voluntarily stepping down in favor of Henry L. Chipman. Lt. Colonel Newcomb Clark was his deputy and both were brevetted for Distinguished and meritorious conduct in the field.

The regiment was organized at Camp Ward, located on a farm in Detroit. Eight-hundred-forty-five men from Detroit, southern Michigan, and Upper Canada (now Ontario), volunteered for the regiment. Some of these early volunteers were escaped slaves from the Underground Railroad; 72 had been living in Canada where their status as free men was assured. While all were fighting against slavery, some were fighting to free actual family members who may have still been in slavery. For these early black volunteers particularly, to step into the spotlight by volunteering took enormous courage, not to mention the bravery of those who crossed back into the US to fight.

During training, a regimental band was formed which toured and performed to attract and recruit more volunteers. The regiment also had artillery and cavalry elements.

The regiment was formed from August through September 1863, amidst that year's draft riots and protests against the war. Mustered in as the 102nd US Colored Troops on February 17, 1864 (or May 23, 1864), the unit was redesignated the 102nd Regiment United States Colored Troops.  The 900-man unit left Detroit on March 28, 1864. The regiment, composed entirely of volunteers, lost almost 10 percent of its men during the nineteen months the regiment was in the field, campaigning throughout South Carolina, eastern Georgia and Florida. The infantry was assigned to the fort at Port Royal where they served as the second line of defense. In Baldwin, Florida, 21 miles away from Jacksonville, the unit was attacked suddenly by a Confederate cavalry force. The soldiers easily defeated the Confederates, which proved to their officers that they were just as skilled and reliable as any other infantry. In Manchester the regiment and the 54th Massachusetts Volunteer Infantry succeeded in an attack on the flank of Confederate forces, putting them in disorder. Then the regiment was attacked by 200 Confederates and caused many casualties to the enemy. The Confederates came to a truce to be informed that Generals Robert E. Lee and Joseph E. Johnston had surrendered; the war was over.

This was the regiment's last battle; they served occupation duty until they were called together and were mustered out of service on September 30, 1865. The regiment returned to Detroit where they were disbanded on October 17, 1865.

Strength and casualties
The total enrollment in the 102nd Regiment was 1,446; 6 people were killed in action, 5 people died of wounds, and 129 people died of disease.

Notable members
Charles L. Barrell, Medal Of Honor, 
1st Lieutenant, 102nd US Colored Infantry
b. 1842 d. 1914, from Michigan
"Citation
Hazardous service in marching through the enemy's country to bring relief to his command"

Marcus Dale, Commissary Seargent, Company C

See also

List of United States Colored Troops Civil War Units

References
 Alkalimat, Abdul (2004). The African American Experience in Cyberspace. Pluto Press.
 Brennan, James. First Michigan Colored Regiment. Available online at https://web.archive.org/web/20150628024930/http://www.michmarkers.com/startup.asp?startpage=S0288.htm, 1991–2007 
 Cahill, Edward F., and Henry Barnes. Edward F. Cahill Collection. 1863. This collection is made up of letters and documents related to Edward F. Cahill's involvement with the 102nd United States Colored Infantry Regiment during and immediately after the Civil War. Included are 3 contracts made between freedmen and their former owners near Edisto River and Orangeburg, South Carolina, in 1865. 
 Dunn, William. A History of the First Michigan Colored Regiment. Thesis (M.A.)--Central Michigan University, 1967, 1967. 
 First Michigan Colored Regiment. Sponsored by the Detroit Branch, Association for the Study of Negro Life and history. Historic plaque located on the grounds of Duffield Elementary School, the original site of Camp Ward, Detroit.
 Harvey, Don & Lois. 1st Regiment Michigan Volunteer Infantry. Available online at
 https://web.archive.org/web/20030623083201/http://www.michiganinthewar.org/infantry/1stcol.htm
 MacRae, Cordella, Emma Ribbron, and Doris Byrd. Civil War Veterans of the 102nd United States Colored Troops, the First Michigan Colored Regiment, Buried in Elmwood Cemetery, Detroit, Michigan. [Detroit, Mich.] (5201 Woodward Ave., Detroit 48202): Fred Hart Williams Genealogical Society, 1990. 
 Nelson, Wilbur, and Gaylord Nelson. Wilbur Nelson. 1864. This collection consists of Nelson's war diaries, several transcriptions, a narrative describing Nelson's war experiences, and a muster roll. Nelson wrote his diaries in shorthand. Included are his original diary for 1864, typed and handwritten transcriptions of the 1864 diary, and a typed transcription of Nelson's diary for 1865 (the original is not included in the collection). The narrative, written by Nelson's grandson, Gaylord Nelson, is based on Wilbur Nelson's diary for 1863 and his correspondence (which are not included in the collection). The muster roll for Company J, 102nd Regiment, U.S. Colored Troops, dated February 14, 1864, lists the name, age, and rank of Nelson's soldiers. 
 Sleight, William E., David D. Anderson, and Jno Robertson. Lieutenant William E. Sleight and the 102nd Regiment, U.S. Colored Infantry, in the Civil War. East Lansing, Mich: Midwestern Press, the Center for the Study of Midwestern Literature and Culture, 2003.
 Smith, Michael O. The First Michigan Colored Infantry A Black Regiment in the Civil War. Thesis (M.A.)--Wayne State University, 1987, 1987.
 United States, and Kenneth L. Cole. Join and Support the First Michigan Colored Infantry Volunteers. Lansing, Mich: First Michigan Colored Infantry Volunteers, 1987.

Notes

Units and formations of the Union Army from Michigan
United States Colored Troops Civil War units and formations
Military units and formations established in 1863
Military units and formations disestablished in 1865
1863 establishments in Michigan
1865 disestablishments in Michigan